Paul Andrew Lee (born 30 May 1952) is an English former professional footballer who played as a striker.

Career
Born in Oxford, Lee played for Oxford City, Hereford United and Chelmsford City. He later managed Abingdon Town in two spells, and in 1998 he became manager of Oxford City, a post he held until 2004.

References

1952 births
Living people
English footballers
Oxford City F.C. players
Hereford United F.C. players
Chelmsford City F.C. players
English Football League players
Association football forwards
English football managers
Abingdon Town F.C. managers
Oxford City F.C. managers